Scorpion Spring is a 1995 American crime thriller film written and directed by Brian Cox and starring Esai Morales, Rubén Blades, Alfred Molina and Matthew McConaughey.

Cast
Alfred Molina as Denis Brabant
Patrick McGaw as Zac Cross
Esai Morales as Astor
Angel Aviles as Nadia
Rubén Blades as Border Patrolman Sam Zaragosa
Kevin Tighe as California County Sheriff Rawley Gill
Richard Edson as Len Wells
Matthew McConaughey as El Rojo
Connie Sawyer as Diner Waitress
Miguel Sandoval as Mexican Judicial
Tony Genaro as Arturo

References

External links
 
 

American crime thriller films
Films scored by Lalo Schifrin
1990s English-language films
1990s American films